Emersons Green is a suburb of Bristol and parish in the unitary authority of South Gloucestershire. Sitting 7 miles northeast of Bristol, England. It was developed from farming land during the 1990s and early 21st century, and sits within the historic parish of Mangotsfield.

Coal was mined from the area during the 19th century. To the south there is a quarry, which has been reactivated.

A science and technology park, in conjunction with Bristol University and University of the West of England, named Bristol & Bath Science Park, has been built on an area of land adjacent to the M4 motorway and the A4174 ringroad. Construction of the £300 million Bristol and Bath Science Park began in early 2010. It was opened in September 2011 and is expected to create 6,000 new jobs within the science and technology sector, when it is completed in 2020.  A link road connecting the M4 to the Avon ring road (A4174) has now been considered a necessary addition to the area, to accommodate the increase in traffic due to the science park.

Governance 
Emersons Green was until 1927 a hamlet in the civil parish of Mangotsfield.  From 1927 to 2015 it was in the civil parish of Mangotsfield Rural.  The parish was renamed Emersons Green in 2015 and enlarged by the addition of areas of the civil parishes of Pucklechurch and Westerleigh.  The parish council elected to be known as Emersons Green Town Council.

The parish has four wards: Badminton, Blackhorse, Pomphrey (3 Councillors each) and Emersons Green itself (7 councillors)

The boundaries of the parish were adjusted to take in the housing development at Lyde Green, and the Science Park. The M4 motorway is now the north eastern boundary.

Lyde Green 
Lyde Green  is a new development within South Gloucestershire that was originally farmland. Its transformation into housing began in the mid 2010s. It is built to the east of Emersons Green.

References

External links 
 Emersons Green Town Council

Populated places in Gloucestershire
Civil parishes in Gloucestershire
Areas of Bristol